Alexandrina Ciocan (née Vutcariova; born 7 January 1995) is a Moldovan footballer who plays as a forward. She has been a member of the Moldova women's national team.

References

1995 births
Living people
Women's association football forwards
Moldovan women's footballers
Moldova women's international footballers
FC Noroc Nimoreni players